The variegated flycatcher (Empidonomus varius) is a species of bird in the family Tyrannidae. With the crowned slaty flycatcher being moved to its own genus, this is now the only species remaining in Empidonomus.

It is found in Argentina, Bolivia, Brazil, Paraguay, Uruguay and the Guianas; it is a vagrant to more northwestern parts of the continent.

Accidental in North America north of Mexico, there have been only ten records:
Maine (1977),
Tennessee (1984),
Ontario (1993,
2020),
Washington (2008),
Florida (2013,
2015,
2021),
Texas (2016),
and Michigan (2022).

It is similar to the smaller piratic flycatcher and larger sulphur-bellied flycatcher.

References

variegated flycatcher
Birds of Argentina
Birds of Bolivia
Birds of Brazil
Birds of the Guianas
Birds of Paraguay
Birds of Uruguay
variegated flycatcher
Taxa named by Louis Jean Pierre Vieillot
Birds of the Amazon Basin
Taxonomy articles created by Polbot